"Drive In Show" is a song originally performed by Eddie Cochran and released on single by Liberty Records in July 1957. "Drive In Show" backed with "Am I Blue" rose to number 82 on the Billboard charts.

Background
"Drive In Show" was recorded sometime between May and August 1957. The song featured an orchestra and chorus under the direction of Johnny Mann. The writer was Fred Dexter. The song was published by American  Music. Sheet music was released for the song with a photograph of Eddie Cochran on the cover.

Personnel
 Eddie Cochran - guitars, ukulele, vocals
 Perry Botkin Sr. - rhythm guitar
 Connie "Guybo" Smith - double bass
 The Johnny Mann Chorus - backing vocals

Chart performance

References

External links
Eddie Cochran US discography

1957 singles
Eddie Cochran songs
Liberty Records singles
1957 songs